Pyrausta cinnamomealis is a moth in the family Crambidae. It was described by Wallengren in 1860. It is found in Cape of Good Hope, South Africa.

References

Endemic moths of South Africa
Moths described in 1860
cinnamomealis
Moths of Africa